A total solar eclipse occurred at the Moon's ascending node of the orbit on April 17, 1912 (Gregorian Calendar) (April 4, 1912 in Julian Calendar, Russia, Turkey, and Balkans). It is a hybrid event, starting and ending as an annular eclipse, with only a small portion of totality (only 1.3 km (0.808 mi or 4,265 feet) wide). A solar eclipse occurs when the Moon passes between Earth and the Sun, thereby totally or partly obscuring the image of the Sun for a viewer on Earth. A total solar eclipse occurs when the Moon's apparent diameter is larger than the Sun's, blocking all direct sunlight, turning day into darkness. Totality occurs in a narrow path across Earth's surface, with the partial solar eclipse visible over a surrounding region thousands of kilometres wide.

Annularity was first visible from southeastern tip of Venezuela, northern tip of Brazil, British Guyana (today's Guyana), Dutch Guiana (today's Suriname) and Porto Santo Island in Madeira, Portugal, then totality from Portugal and Spain, with annularity continued northeast across France (including northwestern suburbs of Paris), Belgium, Netherlands, Germany and Russian Empire (the parts now belonging to northern Latvia, southern Estonia and Russia). Occurring 7.4 days after apogee (Apogee on April 10, 1912) and only 5.5 days before perigee (Perigee on April 22, 1912), the Moon's apparent diameter was larger.

It was the 30th eclipse of the 137th Saros cycle, which began with a partial eclipse on May 25, 1389, and will conclude with a partial eclipse on June 28, 2633. This eclipse occurred two days after the RMS Titanic sank in the northwestern Atlantic Ocean under the darkness of new moon.

Observations

Related eclipses

Solar eclipses 1910–1913

Saros 137 

It is a part of Saros cycle 137, repeating every 18 years, 11 days, containing 70 events. The series started with partial solar eclipse on May 25, 1389. It contains total eclipses from August 20, 1533, through December 6, 1695, first set of hybrid eclipses from December 17, 1713, through February 11, 1804, first set of annular eclipses from February 21, 1822, through March 25, 1876, second set of hybrid eclipses from April 6, 1894, through April 28, 1930, and second set of annular eclipses from May 9, 1948, through April 13, 2507. The series ends at member 70 as a partial eclipse on June 28, 2633. The longest duration of totality was 2 minutes, 55 seconds on September 10, 1569. Solar Saros 137 has 55 umbral eclipses from August 20, 1533, through April 13, 2507 (973.62 years). That is almost 1 millennium.

Notes

References

 Photo of Solar Corona April 17, 1912
 Russia expedition for solar eclipse of April 17, 1912
 The Eclipse of April 17, 1912 as Visible in France Popular Astronomy, vol. 20, pp. 372–375, 
  Flickr photo of eclipse watchers from France

1912 04 17
1912 in science
1912 04 17
April 1912 events